Songzhou or Song Prefecture was a zhou (prefecture) in imperial China centering on modern Shangqiu, Henan, China. It existed (intermittently) from 596 to 1006.

The Song dynasty was named after this prefecture because its founder Emperor Taizu of Song had stationed in Songzhou for many years.

Geography
The administrative region of Songzhou in the Tang dynasty is in the border area of modern eastern Henan, northern Anhui and southwestern Shandong. It probably includes parts of modern: 
 Under the administration of Shangqiu, Henan:
 Shangqiu: Liangyuan District and Suiyang District
 Minquan County
 Sui County
 Ningling County
 Zhecheng County
 Yucheng County
 Xiayi County
 Under the administration of Heze, Shandong:
 Shan County
 Cao County
 Under the administration of Suzhou, Anhui:
 Dangshan County

References
 

Prefectures of the Sui dynasty
Prefectures of the Tang dynasty
Prefectures of the Song dynasty
Prefectures of Later Liang (Five Dynasties)
Prefectures of Later Tang
Prefectures of Later Jin (Five Dynasties)
Prefectures of Later Han (Five Dynasties)
Prefectures of Later Zhou
Shangqiu
Former prefectures in Henan
Former prefectures in Anhui
Former prefectures in Shandong